Pequot Lakes Public Schools, also known as ISD 186, is a school district headquartered in Pequot Lakes, Minnesota.

In addition to Pequot Lakes its attendance area includes Breezy Point, Jenkins, most of Crosslake, a portion of Lake Shore, and a portion of Nisswa.

History
Chris Lindholm became superintendent in 2013.

In 2021 Lindholm narrated a video called "The Rural Reveal" which he talked about socioeconomic issues. He apologized after the video had a negative reception. In May 2021 Lindholm took a position as superintendent of the Cook County School District, and the Pequot Lakes board accepted his resignation.

Schools
 Pequot Lakes High School
 Pequot Lakes Middle School
 Eagle View Elementary School
 Early Childhood

References

External links
 Pequot Lakes Public Schools
School districts in Minnesota
Education in Crow Wing County, Minnesota